Francis Lee may refer to:

Francis Lee (director), English actor and film director of God's Own Country
Francis Lee (footballer), former professional footballer.
Francis Lee (physician) (1661–1719), English writer known for his connection with the Philadelphians
Blair Lee I (Francis Preston Blair Lee, 1857–1944), Democratic member of the United States Senate
Francis Joseph Lee (1857–1909), chess player
Francis Lightfoot Lee (1734–1797), signer of the United States Declaration of Independence
SS Francis L. Lee, a Liberty ship
Francis Nigel Lee (1934–2011), Christian theologian
Francis D. Lee (1826–1885), American architect from Charleston, South Carolina
Francis Lee (lyricist), contemporary Chinese-pop lyricist, writer
Francis F. Lee (born 1927), inventor, entrepreneur, and professor of electrical engineering and computer science
Sir Francis Lee, 4th Baronet (1639–1667), English politician

See also
Frank Lee (disambiguation)
Frances Lee (1906–2000), American actress
Francis Leigh (disambiguation)